Coma Nation is a 2002 album by Canadian band Eidolon.

The album was reviewed with 8/10 in Metal.de, 8.0 in Rockhard.de as well as in Powermetal.de and Metal Express Radio.

Track listing
"Nemesis"
"Coma Nation"
"Scarred"
"The Pentacle Star"
"Lost Voyage"
"Hunt You Down"
"Life in Agony"
"From Below"
"A Day of Infamy"
"Within the Gates"

Credits 
 Pat Mulock – lead vocals
 Glen Drover – guitars, vocals
 Adrian Robichaud – bass
 Shawn Drover – drums, vocals

 Andy LaRocque – mixing

References

2002 albums
Eidolon (band) albums
Metal Blade Records albums